Émile Louis François Désiré Coste (2 February 1862 in Toulon – 7 July 1927 in Toulon) was a French fencer who competed in the late 19th century and early 20th century. He participated in Fencing at the 1900 Summer Olympics in Paris and won the gold medal in the foil, defeating fellow French fencer Henri Masson in the final.

References

External links
 

1862 births
1927 deaths
Sportspeople from Toulon
French male foil fencers
Olympic gold medalists for France
Olympic fencers of France
Fencers at the 1900 Summer Olympics
Place of birth missing
Olympic medalists in fencing
Medalists at the 1900 Summer Olympics